Protyparcha is a genus of moths of the family Crambidae. It contains only one species, Protyparcha scaphodes, which is endemic to New Zealand, where it is known only from Auckland Islands. Both the genus and species were described by Edward Meyrick in 1909.

References

Crambinae
Taxa named by Edward Meyrick
Monotypic moth genera
Moths of New Zealand
Endemic fauna of New Zealand
Crambidae genera
Endemic moths of New Zealand